Panthrakikos Football Club is a Greek football club based in Komotini, Thrace in North Eastern Greece founded in 1963. The club competed in Super League Greece during the 2008–09 season for the first time.

History

Early years (1963–2001)

Panthrakikos F.C. was formed in the town of Komotini in 1963. Athlitiki Enosis Komotini (Athletic Union of Komotini) which was founded in 1936, and Orpheus Komotini which was founded in 1948 were merged with Panthrakikos in 1963 and 1964 respectively.
The club participated in regional leagues until 1969, when they joined the Beta Ethniki. They stayed in this division until being relegated in 1978, but were promoted back to Beta Ethniki after a single season. They remained here until 1983. Panthrakikos finished 1982–83 12th in Beta Ethniki, but were relegated to Gamma Ethniki due to restructuring of the leagues. In 1983–84 they finished 18th position and were further relegated to Delta Ethniki. The club was promoted again to the Gamma Ethniki, and participated there in 1985–86 and 1986–87. Relegation to Delta Ethniki followed the end of the 1986–87 season. After relegation in 1995-1996, Panthrakikos merged with Orpheus Xylagani and competed as Panthrakikos Xylagani on the founding status of Xylagani during the years 1996–1998. Competed again as Panthrakikos F.C. in lowest level of local leagues during the years 1998-2001, without any administration and without any investment. In that period, very few fans were take charge of administration.

New era (2001–present)
In 2001-2003 Panagiotis Margaritis take charge of administration as chairman and Sakis Skoulis as manager. They were promoted two seasons in a row, reaching the Delta Ethniki in 2003.
In 2004 prompting significant investment into the club from local entrepreneurs Thodoris Savakis, Tasos Karaolanis & Yiannis Kitzidis. Kostas Vasilakakis, a former player of Panthrakikos, was hired as manager in the summer of 2004. In season 2004–05 Panthrakikos were champions of Delta Ethniki and were again promoted, to the Gamma Ethniki. A third-place finish in 2005–06 saw them promoted once more, to the Beta Ethniki.
Three managers were hired in the first half of the season 2006-2007. Zisis Tsekos, Dimitrios Kalaitzidis and Yiannis Gounaris, were fired to be replaced by manager Kostas Vasilakakis and lead the club to an 11th-place finish. Panthrakikos started the 2007–08 season with a breach of league rules in their opening game, against Chaidari, and were penalised by a four-point reduction. Despite this penalty, Panthrakikos beat Ilisiakos 1–0 in the final game of the season to overtake PAS Giannena, finish third and gain promotion to Super League Greece for the first time. Emilio Ferrera, was hired as manager in the summer of 2008, lead Panthrakikos to an 11th place finish in their first Super League season.
On January 25, 2017, Panthrakikos withdrew from the Football League (Level 2) due to financial problems after the 12th game of the period.

After competing in the Regional Amateur League of Thrace for over 4 years, Panthrakikos got promoted once again to Gamma Ethniki and will be competing in the competition for the 2022/23 Football Season.

Facilities

Stadium

The "Municipal Athletic Center" (ΔΑΚ – Δημοτικό Αθλητικό Κέντρο) was built in 1923 by the Hellenic Army near the railway station of Komotini. Panthrakikos has played there since 1963.

The northern grandstand was built in 1950 (rebuilt 1963–1965) with a capacity of about 2,500 while the southern grandstand was built in 1970 with a capacity of about 1,500. The northern grandstand and southern grandstand were rebuilt in 2008 with a capacity of 1,608 (1,377 seats for gate 1 plus 231 seats for gate 7) and 1,090 (gate 5) respectively. In the southern grandstand at the back of, there is a big booth for the Radio and TV journalists (gate 4). Also there is special area for disabled (gate 3). The western grandstand was built in 2008 with a capacity of 2,002 (gate 6 – guests). Finally, the eastern grandstand was built in 2009 with a capacity of 1,498 (gate 2). The total capacity of OPAP-Municipal Komotini Stadium is 6,198 seats.

Panthrakikos Athletic Center

The training center is called "Panthrakikos Athletic Center". It covers a field of 42,000 sq.m. located 4 km east of Komotini at Kikidio village.

The main building covers 360 sq.m.. Includes the administration office, the press room, first aid station, physiotherapy chamber and locker room. Three full-sized terrains (two with natural turf, one with synthetic turf) are used for the first squad trainings. A half-sized terrain is also used for the goalkeepers training.

Another building 200 sq.m., which includes locker room, showers and dining room for the Youth team and the football academies. Two half-sized terrains and one full-sized are used by the Youth Teams.

Team statistics
According to combined sources

-1 16 games - 32 points
-2 24 games - 55 points
-3 promotion due to the restructuring of the Beta Ethniki League
-4 38 games - 58 points
-5 Panthrakikos merged with Orfeas Xylagani and competed as Panthrakikos Xylagani in 1996-1998
-6 Panthrakikos withdrew from the league during the period due to financial problems
-7 Due to the reorganization of the Greek football league system the first divisions of the local championships became a 5th tier

Domestic titles
Football League: (1)
 2011–12
Gamma Ethniki: (1)
 1978–79
Delta Ethniki: (2)
 1984–85
 2004–05

Notable player

Players statistics

Appearances and goals from 2006–present
Only with Panthrakikos F.C. As of 18 April 2016 according to combined sources

Former players
Former players with Wikipedia article see :Category:Panthrakikos F.C. players.

Former players without Wikipedia article, based on their long-term presence in Panthrakikos, players worthy of mention are Filippos Aivazis (1967–84) who holds the record for most appearances (405) and most goals (89) in the Beta and Gamma Ethniki, Apostolos Hatziioannidis - Apostolakis (1956-64 Orfeas Komotini, 1964-69 AO Kavala, 1967-77 Panthrakikos F.C.), Zacharias Tilios (1964–76), Stavros Svintridis, Christos Doulgerakis, Archontis Katsaridis, Manolis Rakitzoglou, Vasilis Fotidis, Kostas Kalaitzidis and Kostas Vasilakakis (1973–81).

Chairmen and managers

Crest and colours
Panthrakikos crest is a sparkling flaming torch in a circle. The torch is surrounded by the club's name and the year of establishment. The club crest sits on the left side of the chest. Traditional club's colors are green and white.

Traditional colours

Alternative colours

References

External links

  
Panthracrocs; news, photos, statistics 

 
Association football clubs established in 1963
Komotini
Football clubs in Eastern Macedonia and Thrace
1963 establishments in Greece